Revolutionary Youth Alliance ( - AJR) is a far-left political youth movement in Brazil, being a faction of the Workers' Cause Party (PCO). AJR publishes Juventude Revolucionária and works within the National Students Union (UNE). AJR also takes part in student council elections.

References

External links
AJR website
Far-left politics in Brazil
Youth wings of political parties in Brazil